The following is a list of Sites of Special Scientific Interest (SSSIs) in Cumbria, England, United Kingdom. In England the body responsible for designating SSSIs is Natural England, which chooses a site because of its fauna, flora, geological or physiographical features.

As of July 2012 there were 278 SSSIs within Cumbria. Of these, 70 are listed purely for their geological interest and 170 for their biological interest. A further 38 have both geological and biological interest.

The county includes the whole of the Lake District National Park, as well as three Areas of Outstanding Natural Beauty: the Solway Coast, part of Arnside and Silverdale, and part of the North Pennines.

For SSSIs in other counties, see List of SSSIs by Area of Search.

Sites

Notes
Data rounded to one decimal place.
Grid reference is based on the British national grid reference system, also known as OSGB36, and is the system used by the Ordnance Survey.
Link to maps using the Nature on the Map service provided by Natural England.

See also
List of Regionally Important Geological / Geomorphological Sites (RIGS) in Cumbria

References

External links

Natural England Reports and Statistics data for Cumbria

 
Cumbria
Sites of Special Scientific Interest